Pieter Jansz van Ruyven (1651, Delft – 1719, Delft), was a Dutch Golden Age painter.

Biography
According to Houbraken he was a pupil of Jacob Jordaens who became specialized in large decorative pieces for ceilings, and walls. He made the festive triumphal arches for the joyous entry of William III of England in the Hague. He knew the painter Adriaen Cornelisz van Linschoten as an old man in Delft.

According to the RKD he was a pupil of Willem Doudijns and became a member of the Confrerie Pictura in the Hague. Most of his known works are still installed in the buildings for which they were made. Although he is registered in Antwerp and in the Hague when Jacob Jordaens was there, the RKD claims he was also a pupil of Hans IV Jordaens, not Jacques Jordaens.

References

 Pieter Jansz van Ruyven at the Rijksmuseum
Pieter Jansz van Ruyven on Artnet

External links
Vermeer and The Delft School, a full text exhibition catalog from The Metropolitan Museum of Art, which contains material on Pieter Jansz van Ruyven

1651 births
1719 deaths
Dutch Golden Age painters
Dutch male painters
Artists from Delft
Painters from The Hague